is metro station located in Tsuzuki Ward, Yokohama, Kanagawa Prefecture, Japan. It is served by the Yokohama Municipal Subway’s  Green Line (Line 4) and is 1.7 kilometers from the terminus of the Green Line at Nakayama Station.

History
Kawawachō Station opened on March 30, 2008 when the Green Line started operation.

Lines 
Yokohama Municipal Subway
Green Line

Station layout
Kawawachō Station is an above ground station with a single island platform serving four elevated tracks. The station building is located underneath the tracks and platform. The platform is numbered Platform 3 and Platform 4. There is no Platform 1 or Platform 2, and these tracks are used as a rail yard for to removal of train carriages from the main rail lines of the Green Line.

Platforms

References

External links
 Kawawacho Station (Japanese)

Railway stations in Kanagawa Prefecture
Railway stations in Japan opened in 2008
Green Line (Yokohama)